Steven Howarth (born 3 June 1992 in Glasgow) is a Scottish professional footballer who last played as a striker for Scottish Second Division side Albion Rovers.

Career

Clyde
Howarth started his career at Clyde, but had to wait until the 2009–10 season before making his breakthrough to the first team. He made a total of 11 appearances for the Bully Wee, scoring just one goal. He was mostly credited for his hard-working ability, and his good performances that season earned him, and team-mate Connor Stevenson, a trial at champions Rangers on October 2009. It was to be a poor season overall for Howarth, as Clyde were relegated to the Third Division, finishing bottom.

Motherwell
Howarth joined SPL club Motherwell in the closing hours of the transfer window on 31 August 2010. He is who plays for the under-19 side and reserve side at the Steelmen.

Howarth signed a new one-year professional contract at Motherwell, having been top scorer for the under-19 side in the 2010–11 season with 15 goals.

On 1 February 2012, Howarth and his club agreed to an early termination of his contract, four months before it was due to end.

Alloa Athletic (loan)
On 30 August 2011, Howarth joined Alloa Athletic on a one-month loan.

Albion Rovers
After spending months out of the game, Howarth was given a trial at Albion Rovers, and was awarded a contract after impressing manager Todd Lumsden.

References

External links
 

1992 births
Living people
Footballers from Glasgow
Scottish footballers
Association football forwards
Clyde F.C. players
Motherwell F.C. players
Alloa Athletic F.C. players
Albion Rovers F.C. players
Scottish Football League players